Kotorac may refer to:
 Gornji Kotorac, Istočna Ilidža, Republika Srpska, Bosnia and Herzegovina
 Kotorac, Montenegro